Žarkovac can refer to:

 Žarkovac, Ruma, a village near Ruma, Serbia
 Žarkovac, Sombor, a settlement (hamlet) near Sombor, Serbia